Lenni station is a defunct commuter rail station on the SEPTA Regional Rail R3 West Chester Line, located in Middletown Township, Delaware County, Pennsylvania. The station and several others were closed in September 1986, and subsequently demolished.

History

Built by the Pennsylvania Railroad, Lenni station stood on the corner of Station Lane and Lenni Road. It served as a stop on the West Chester Branch. It later became a part of SEPTA's R3 West Chester line.

The PRR's former Chester Creek Branch terminated at Lenni. The line sustained heavy flash flood damage in September 1971 (not due to the later Hurricane Agnes as is sometimes claimed), and was taken out of service at that time. The railway was never officially abandoned, and has since been deeded to SEPTA via PennDOT.

The station, and all of those west of Elwyn station, was closed in September 1986, due to deteriorating track conditions and Chester County's desire to expand facilities at Exton station on SEPTA's Paoli/Thorndale Line. Service was suspended that time, with substitute bus service provided. Lenni station still appears in publicly posted tariffs.

The station shed itself was demolished in 1990s; the asphalt platform and signage remained extant until around 2019.

Since passenger service ended in 1986, vandals began stealing the copper catenary wire. A live SEPTA substation exists nearby with transmission lines connecting to Amtrak's Lamokin converter station. The line remains electrified as far west as the former Darlington station. Wire was removed for the remainder of the line out to West Chester over the summer of 2005 to prevent further theft.

Resumption of SEPTA service to Wawa station, opened in August 2022, does not include an intermediate stop at Lenni, although the service restoration project provides for construction of a new station if demand warrants.

References

External links

Picture of original Lenni Station
Existing Railroad Stations in Delaware County, Pennsylvania

Railway stations closed in 1986
Former SEPTA Regional Rail stations
Stations on the West Chester Line
Demolished railway stations in the United States
1986 disestablishments in Pennsylvania
Former railway stations in Delaware County, Pennsylvania